Slogan is a 1969 French satirical romantic comedy-drama film co-written and directed by Pierre Grimblat. It stars Serge Gainsbourg and Jane Birkin in their first film together. The film marked the beginning of the 13-year relationship between Gainsbourg and Birkin.

Plot 
Serge Fabergé is a 40-year-old director who leaves his pregnant wife Françoise to attend an advertising award festival in Venice. There, he meets Evelyne, a young British woman, and initiates an affair. Evelyne eventually leaves him for another man.

Cast
 Serge Gainsbourg as Serge Fabergé
 Jane Birkin as Evelyne
 Juliet Berto as secretary
 Daniel Gélin as Evelyne's father
 Henri-Jacques Huet as M. Joly
 James Mitchellas as Hugh
 Andréa Parisy as Françoise
 Gilles Millinaire as Dado
 Roger Lumont as Serge's lawyer (uncredited)
 Robert Lombard as motorist (uncredited)
 Kate Barry as Serge's daughter (uncredited)

Production 
Grimblat initially wanted American actress Marisa Berenson to play the role of Evelyne, but decided on an English actress instead.

Grimblat was nominated for an award in Venice for a Renault advert, and because nobody knew what he looked like, he asked Serge Gainsbourg to pretend he was Grimblat and collect the award, so that he could film the ceremony and use the footage in Slogan. 

The filming of Slogan was temporarily delayed due to the 1968 riots in France.

Filming took place between June 26 and August 16 , 19681 in Venice , Italy . “It was on this film that Serge Gainsbourg and Jane Birkin met . At first, Gainsbourg "snubbed" Birkin and the making of the film suffered. Pierre Grimblat decides to change the course of things by inviting them to a dinner, to which he had planned not to come (by playing double or quits in a way). Without a witness at this meal, Gainsbourg and Birkin finally reconciled and began their relationship”.

References

Bibliography

External links
 
 
 

1969 films
1969 comedy-drama films
1969 romantic comedy films
1960s French films
1960s French-language films
1960s romantic comedy-drama films
1960s satirical films
Films scored by Serge Gainsbourg
Films shot in Paris
Films shot in Venice
French romantic comedy-drama films
French satirical films